List of rivers in Goiás (Brazilian State).

The list is arranged by drainage basin, with respective tributaries indented under each larger stream's name and ordered from downstream to upstream. All rivers in Goiás drain to the Atlantic Ocean.

By Drainage Basin

Tocantins/Araguaia Basin 

 Tocantins River
 Araguaia River
 Braço Menor do Rio Araguaia River
 Formoso River (Tocantins)
 Pau-Seco River
 Verde River
 Tiúba River
 Crixás Açu River
 Crixás Mirim River
 Pintado River
 Palmital River
 Gregório River
 Dos Bois River
 Peixe River
 Peixe River
 Tesoura River
 Palmeiras River
 Vermelho River
 Claro River
 Caiapó River
 Piranhas River
 Bonito River
 Peixe River
 Diamantina River
 Matrinxã River
 Babilônia River
 Paranã River
 Palma River (Tocantins)
 Mosquito River
 Bezerra River (Montes Claros River)
 Das Pedras River
 São Domingos River
 Manso River
 São Bernardo River
 Corrente River
 Macambira River
 Vermelho River
 Cana Brava River
 Crixás River
 Santa Tereza River
 Cana Brava River
 Do Ouro River
 Mocambo River
 Cana Brava River
 Preto River
 Claro River
 Tocantizinho River
 Bagagem River
 Traíras River
 Maranhão River
 Das Almas River
 Dos Bois River
 São Patrício River
 Peixe River
 Verde River
 Uru River
 Dos Patos River
 Verde River
 Do Sal River
 Arraial Velho River
 Das Palmas River
 Das Salinas River

São Francisco Basin 

 São Francisco River (Bahia, Minas Gerais)
 Paracatu River (Minas Gerais)
 Preto River
 Salabro River
 São Bernardo River
 Bezerra River

Paraná Basin 

 Paraná River (Argentina, Paraná, Mato Grosso do Sul)
 Paranaíba River
 Aporé River
 Da Prata River
 Corrente River
 Formoso River
 Jacuba River
 Verde River
 Claro River
 Doce River
 Alegre River
 Preto River
 Dos Bois River
 Verde River (Verdão River)
 São Tomás River
 Verdinho River
 Turvo River
 Capivara River
 Meia Ponte River
 Dourados River
 Caldas River
 João Leite River
 Piracanjuba River
 Corumbá River
 Peixe River
 Piracanjuba River
 São Bartolomeu River
 Ponte Alta River
 Descoberto River
 Areias River
 Das Antas River
 Veríssimo River
 São Marcos River
 São Bento River
 Samambaia River
 Verde River

Alphabetically 

 Alegre River
 Das Almas River
 Das Antas River
 Aporé River
 Araguaia River
 Areias River
 Arraial Velho River
 Babilônia River
 Bagagem River
 Bezerra River
 Bezerra River (Montes Claros River)
 Dos Bois River
 Dos Bois River
 Dos Bois River
 Bonito River
 Braço Menor do Rio Araguaia River
 Caiapó River
 Caldas River
 Cana Brava River
 Cana Brava River
 Cana Brava River
 Capivara River
 Claro River
 Claro River
 Claro River
 Corrente River
 Corrente River
 Corumbá River
 Crixás Açu River
 Crixás Mirim River
 Crixás River
 Descoberto River
 Diamantina River
 Doce River
 Dourados River
 Formoso River
 Palmeiras River
 Jacuba River
 João Leite River
 Macambira River
 Manso River
 Maranhão River
 Matrinxã River
 Meia Ponte River
 Mocambo River
 Mosquito River
 Do Ouro River
 Das Palmas River
 Palmeiras River
 Palmital River
 Paranã River
 Paranaíba River
 Dos Patos River
 Pau-Seco River
 Das Pedras River
 Peixe River
 Peixe River
 Peixe River
 Peixe River
 Peixe River
 Pintado River
 Piracanjuba River
 Piracanjuba River
 Piranhas River
 Da Prata River
 Preto River
 Preto River
 Preto River
 Ponte Alta River
 Do Sal River
 Salabro River
 Das Salinas River
 Samambaia River
 Santa Tereza River
 São Bartolomeu River
 São Bento River
 São Bernardo River
 São Bernardo River
 São Domingos River
 São Marcos River
 São Patrício River
 São Tomás River
 Tesoura River
 Tiúba River
 Tocantins River
 Tocantizinho River
 Traíras River
 Turvo River
 Uru River
 Verde River
 Verde River (Verdão River)
 Verde River
 Verde River
 Verde River
 Verde River
 Verdinho River
 Veríssimo River
 Vermelho River
 Vermelho River

References
 Map from Ministry of Transport
 Rand McNally, The New International Atlas, 1993.
  GEOnet Names Server

 
Goias